Bucksnort or Buck Snort may refer to:
 Bucksnort, Tennessee, Hickman County
 Buck Snort, Arkansas, Craighead County
 Bucksnort (Alabama)
 Bucksnort (Minnesota)
 Bankston, Alabama, Fayette County, formerly called Bucksnort
 Edinburg, Missouri, Grundy County, formerly called Buck Snort
 Mimosa, Tennessee, Lincoln County, formerly called Bucksnort
 Sarahville de Viesca, Texas, Falls County, ghost town also called Bucksnort
. The Village of Bucksnort, North Carolina